__notoc__

Peter Maas (June 27, 1929 – August 23, 2001) was an American journalist and author. He was born in New York City and attended Duke University. Maas had Dutch and Irish ancestry.

He was the biographer of Frank Serpico, a New York City Police officer who testified against police corruption. He is also the author of the number one New York Times bestseller, Underboss, about the life and times of Sammy "The Bull" Gravano.

His other notable bestsellers include The Valachi Papers, Manhunt, and  In a Child's Name, recipient of the 1991 Edgar Award for Best Fact Crime book. The Valachi Papers, which told the story of Mafia turncoat Joseph Valachi, is widely considered to be a seminal work, as it spawned an entire genre of books written by or about former Mafiosi.

Maas died in New York City, aged 72, on August 23, 2001. He made a brief cameo as himself in an episode of Homicide: Life on the Street.

Bibliography 
1967—The Rescuer: The Extraordinary Life of the Navy's "Swede" Momsen and His Role in an Epic Submarine Disaster. ASIN B000IDBZ58 (Note: The Terrible Hours pulls material from this book.)
1968—The Valachi Papers  filmed as The Valachi Papers
1973—Serpico: The Cop Who Defied the System  filmed as Serpico
1974—King of the Gypsies  filmed as King of the Gypsies
1979—Made in America: A Novel 
1983—Marie: A True Story  filmed as Marie, winner of a Christopher Award
1986—Manhunt: The Incredible Pursuit of a CIA Agent Turned Terrorist  The story of CIA agent Edwin P. Wilson.
1989—Father and Son: A Novel 
1990—In a Child's Name: The Legacy of a Mother's Murder  filmed as In a Child's Name
1994—China White: A Novel 
1996—Killer Spy: Inside Story of the FBI's Pursuit and Capture of Aldrich Ames, America's Deadliest Spy  (Note: This is the mass market paperback edition.)
1997—Underboss 
1999—The Terrible Hours: The Man Behind the Greatest Submarine Rescue in History  The story of Charles Momsen's rescue of the USS Squalus (SS-192).

See also 
Charles Momsen, the subject of Maas' book The Terrible Hours: The Man Behind the Greatest Submarine Rescue in History

References

External links 

Peter Maas obituary, The New York Times, August 24, 2001.

1929 births
2001 deaths
American male journalists
Non-fiction writers about organized crime in the United States
Organized crime memoirists
Edgar Award winners
Writers from New York (state)
American people of Irish descent
American people of Dutch descent
Duke University alumni